Aleksandr Aleksandrovich Russkikh (born 11 September 1983) is a former Russian professional footballer.

Club career
He made his debut in the Russian Premier League in 2006 for FC Tom Tomsk.

References

1983 births
Sportspeople from Tomsk
Living people
Russian footballers
Association football midfielders
FC Tom Tomsk players
FC Mordovia Saransk players
FC Sakhalin Yuzhno-Sakhalinsk players
FK Banga Gargždai players
Russian Premier League players
A Lyga players
Russian expatriate footballers
Expatriate footballers in Lithuania
FC Chita players